The Pangjiapu mine is a large iron  mine located in northern China. Pangjiapu represents one of the largest iron ore reserves in China and in the world having estimated reserves of 100 million tonnes of ore grading 45% iron metal.

References 

Iron mines in China